Walid Hassan Abdallah Ibrahim Al Rekabi (born 19 November 1991) is a professional footballer who plays as a right-back for Almahalla SC. Born in Libya, he represents the Sudan national team.

Career
Hassan is a youth product of the Libyan club Almahalla SC, and began his career with them. He followed them with stints at Aschat SC, Al Khums SC and Ittihad Misurata. In 2019, after the Libyan Premier League got stopped, he moved to the Sudanese club Al-Merrikh SC. He returned to this first club Almahalla on 24 May 2021.

International career
Born in Libya, Hassan is of Sudanese descent. Hassan made his debut with the Sudan national team in a friendly 1–0 win over Eritrea on 25 January 2020.

References

External links
 
 

1991 births
Living people
People from Tripoli, Libya
Sudanese footballers
Sudan international footballers
Libyan footballers
Libyan people of Sudanese descent
Association football fullbacks
Al-Merrikh SC players
Libyan Premier League players
Sudan Premier League players